Brigitte Florence Fossey (born 15 June 1946) is a French actress.

Early years
The daughter of a schoolteacher, Fossey was five years old when she was cast by director René Clément to star in his film, Forbidden Games.  Fossey played the role of an innocent child orphaned by World War II. The film won numerous awards worldwide, including the Academy Award for Best Foreign Language Film, and Fossey was hired by American actor/director Gene Kelly for his 1957 film, The Happy Road. When Fossey was ten years old her parents took her out of the film business so she could receive proper schooling. While completing her education, Fossey studied piano and dance and then went on to work in Geneva, Switzerland as an interpreter/translator.

Career
In 1967, at age twenty, after studying acting at Yves Furet "Studio d'Entrainement de l'Acteur" in Paris, Fossey was offered the female lead by director Jean-Gabriel Albicocco for his film Le Grand Meaulnes.  As an adult Fossey acted both on stage and in film, working with French directors such as François Truffaut and Bertrand Blier. Fluent in English, Fossey has appeared in several Hollywood motion pictures, including a 1979 role as the wife of Paul Newman in the Robert Altman-directed film, Quintet. In 1982, she was a member of the jury at the 32nd Berlin International Film Festival. During the 1990s, she began performing in television productions.

Personal life
Brigitte Fossey has a daughter from her marriage to director Jean-François Adam, whom she met while making his 1970 film .

Awards and recognition
 1977: Nominated for a César Award for Best Actress in a Supporting Role for Le bon et les méchants
 1978: Nominated for a César Award for Best Actress for Les Enfants du placard

Selected filmography

References

External links

 
 
 

French film actresses
French stage actresses
French child actresses
1946 births
Living people
People from Tourcoing